Gary Crewe (born 25 March 1946) is a former British international cyclist.

Cycling career
Represented Great Britain:

 World Road Championship Amateur in 1970, Leicester
 World Road Championship Professional in 1971, Mendrisio
 Manx International
Tour of Britain Milk Race
 Tour of Algeria
 G.P. Annaba

Represented England:

 1970 British Commonwealth Games in Edinburgh, Scotland. (8th place)
 Tour of Grampians (4th place)
 Tour of Scotland (19th place)
 1973 Tour de Suisse (35th place)

Professional victories:

 1974 Plymouth criterium
 1973 Tour of the West 5 day
 1973 Mountains G.P.
 1972 British National Road Race Championships. (1st)
 1972 Mountains G.P. Tour of West
 1972 Brooklands Criterium
 1971 Tour of the North stage 2

Major amateur results:

 1992 National Series MTB Plymouth (1st)
1991 National Masters MTB Championship Malvern (3rd)
1970 Manx International (1st)
 1970 Western Division Champion (1st)
 1970 Tour of Grampians stage 3 (1st)
 1970 National Amateur Road Championship (2nd)
 1970 Tour of Britain  Mountains G.P. (2nd)
 1970 Tour of Grampians (4th)
 1970 Commonwealth Games Road (8th)
 1970 Tour of Britain Milk Race (15th)
 1969 National Amateur Road Championship (7th)
 1969 raced in Brittany France most of year
 1969 Wenvoe RR (1st)
 1968 National Amateur Road Championship (5th)
 1968 Ras de Cymru stage 1 (1st)
 1968 Tour of Scotland Milk Race (19th)
 1968 Tour of Britain Milk Race (29th)
 1967 Western Division Champion (1st)
 1967 National Amateur Road Championship (14th)

References 

1946 births
Living people
British male cyclists
Cyclists at the 1970 British Commonwealth Games
Commonwealth Games competitors for England